Le Trio Joubran  is an oud trio playing traditional Palestinian music. The trio consists of the brothers Samir, Wissam, and Adnan Joubran, originally from the city of Nazareth, now dividing their time between Nazareth, Ramallah and Paris. The Joubran brothers come from a well-known family with a rich artistic heritage. Their mother, Ibtisam Hanna Joubran, sang the Muwashahat (poems that originated in Arab Spain) while their father, Hatem, is among the most renowned stringed-instrument makers in Palestine and in the Arab world. They are the first oud trio.

Formation 
Samir Joubran, the eldest brother, began a successful music career in 1996, nearly a decade before the formation of the Joubran Trio. Samir released two acclaimed albums Taqaseem in 1996, followed by Sou'fahm in 2001. For his third album, Samir invited his younger brother, Wissam, to accompany him in duets. That album, Tamaas, was released in 2003. After returning from a tour, Samir proposed forming a trio with his youngest brother Adnan. In August 2004, in the Luxembourg Gardens in Paris, Le Trio Joubran came to life.

Awards
In 2009, Arab Muhr award, Dubai International Film Festival
 Best soundtrack for Adieu Gary, directed by Nassim Amaouche

In 2011, "Arab Muhr" award, Dubai International Film Festival
 Best soundtrack for The Last Friday, directed by Yahya Al Abdallah

In 2013, The Order of Merit and Excellence from Palestinian President Mahmoud Abbas.

In 2013, International Award of Palestine

Discography 
Studio albums

Tamaas  (2002)
Randana (2005)
Majâz (2007)
À l'ombre des mots (2008)
Le Dernier VoL, with Chkrrr (2009)
AsFâr, featuring Dhafer Youssef (2011)
The First Ten Years (2013) Series of 5 CDs and 1 DVD
The Long March (2018)

References

External links 
 Le Trio Joubran (official website)
 Facebook
 Wissam Joubran (official website)
 Adnan Joubran (official website)
 Interview with Le Trio Joubran in www.theglobaldispatches.com

Oud players
Palestinian musical groups